13th man or thirteenth man may refer to:

 13th man (Canadian football), like the 12th man in 11-player forms of football, a reference to fans of a 12-player Canadian football team
 The 13th Man, a 1937 American mystery film
 The Thirteenth Man, a 1917 Italian drama silent film